Younes Reggab (born 1975) is a Moroccan filmmaker and screenwriter. He is the son of filmmaker Mohamed Reggab. His films have been screened at numerous Moroccan film festivals and he has been a part of the juries of a number of them.

Filmography

Feature films 

 2014: Feuilles mortes (Dead Leaves)

Short films 

 2003: Khouya (My Brother)
 2006: Cigarette
 2006: Caen et Abel (Cain and Abel)
 2006: Imprévue (Unforeseen)
 2006: Nuit d'enfer (Night of Hell)
 2008: Minuit (Midnight)
 2010: Statue

References 

1975 births
Living people